Holly Ross is a musician from Lancaster, England best known as guitarist and lead vocalist of bands Angelica (1994-2003) and The Lovely Eggs (2006–present). Her singing has been described as "soft as butter Lancastrian tones."

Discography

Albums
 The End of a Beautiful Career (2000) (Mini-Album)
 The Seven Year Itch (2002)

Singles
 "Teenage Girl Crush" (1997)
 "Why Did You Let My Kitten Die?" (1999)
 "Bring Back Her Head" (1999)
 "Take Me I'm Your Disease" (2000)

Compilation albums
 Deceptive Fifty (1998)
 Ladyfest UK 2001 (2001)
 Ladyfest UK 2003 (2003)

References

Year of birth missing (living people)
Living people
People from Lancaster, Lancashire
English punk rock singers
English women singers
English women guitarists
English punk rock guitarists
Women punk rock singers